Michael Uppendahl is an American television and film director.

He is well known for his work on the AMC period drama Mad Men; the FX shows American Horror Story, Fargo, and Legion; and the Fox musical/dramedy Glee.

Career
His first television credit came from directing 4 episodes of the CBS sitcom Becker, from 2003-2004. He wrote, directed and produced the 2009 short film A Hundred & Forty-Six Questions, starring Jamie Anne Allman.

Since 2008, Uppendahl has directed 7 hours of the AMC drama Mad Men, for which he has received critical acclaim. In 2011 and 2012, Uppendahl joined the crews of Fox's Glee and FX's American Horror Story, directing 2 episodes of the former and 3 of the latter.

In 2013, Uppendahl made his feature film directorial debut with Grounded (formerly under the working title, Quad), a drama about a salesman that becomes a quadriplegic. It was co-written by Michael Burke, Mike Young, Robin Veith, and Brett Johnson. Jeff Daniels, Lena Olin, Aaron Paul, and Tom Berenger star. The film was later renamed Adam and released in 2020.

Uppendahl served as co-executive producer and director on the first season of Marvels Legion; which airs on FX. The series centers on David Haller, possibly the most powerful mutant on the planet.

Filmography

Television credits

References

External links

American film directors
American television directors
Living people
Place of birth missing (living people)
Year of birth missing (living people)